Scott Rogers is an English professional football manager, who is currently head coach of Accrington Stanley F.C.. He has managed the side previously, as well as the women's teams of Blackburn Rovers as an assistant coach, Liverpool FC Women. After being fired from Liverpool in 2015, Chris Kirkland took over the side.

Honours 
Liverpool Women

 FA Women's Super League: 2012–13, 2013–14

References

Liverpool L.F.C. managers
English women's football managers
Women's Super League managers
Year of birth missing (living people)
Living people